The port city of Olympia, Washington, has been a center of post-hardcore, anti-folk, and other youth-oriented musical genres since the late 1970s. Before this period, Olympia's The Fleetwoods had several Billboard chart successes between 1959 and 1963. Olympia saw a rise in feminism in the music industry, where artists commonly addressed rape, domestic abuse, sexuality, racism, patriarchy, classism, anarchism, and female empowerment in their songs. It was a center for the riot grrrl movement of the early 1990s, which featured Bikini Kill and Bratmobile.

Olympia's downtown Capitol Theater hosted the punk and indie-rock International Pop Underground Convention in 1991 and the Yoyo-A-Go-Go festival in 1994, 1997, 1999 and 2001. The city has several record labels and companies, including K Records and Kill Rock Stars; Kill Rock Stars has signed Bikini Kill, Sleater-Kinney, Unwound and Elliott Smith.

Notable musicians and groups

Bangs, part of the riot grrrl movement, formed in 1997 and were active until 2010. Kill Rock Stars signed the band.
Beat Happening, which formed in 1982, played lo-fi music.
Bikini Kill, which formed in 1990 as pioneers of the riot grrrl movement, released several EPs and two albums.
The Blow, founded in 2001, deliver Olympia-influenced monologues.
Bratmobile played punk and early riot grrrl music from 1991 to 2003.
Cool Rays, formed by Evergreen State College students in 1980, played during the 1980s and 1990s.
Lois Maffeo was most active during the early 1990s.
Dub Narcotic Sound System, formed in 1995, was signed to K Records.
Earth, 1989–1997, 2003–present.
Excuse 17 recorded from 1993 to 1995.
The Fleetwoods, a vocal pop group, recorded "Come Softly to Me" (their debut single and biggest hit) in 1959.
The Frumpies, a lo-fi punk rock band, formed in 1992 and split in 2000.
G.L.O.S.S. was a trans-feminist hardcore punk band which formed in 2014 and split in 2016. 
godheadSilo: A noise rock duo which first formed in 1991 and reformed in 2015, focusing on stoner rock and sludge metal.
The Go Team was a duo which was active from 1985 to 1989.
Gossip was active from 1999 to 2016, and participated in Olympia's 2000 Ladyfest.
Heavens to Betsy was a punk duo which formed during the early 1990s.
Milk Music was a four-member band founded in 2008.
The Need, a queercore band formed in the mid-1990s, was signed to the Kill Rock Stars label and was active until 2001.
The Old Haunts, formed in 2001, was also signed to the Kill Rock Stars label.
Sleater-Kinney, originally part of the riot grrrl movement, has released ten albums since 1994.
Team Dresch is an American queercore/punk band which formed in 1993.
Wynne Greenwood performed electropop music as Tracy + the Plastics during the early 2000s via video projection.
Unwound was active from 1991 to 2002.

Radio stations
 KAOS Olympia Community Radio 89.3 FM
KXXO

Record labels
K Records (founded 1982): Although it primarily released indie-rock records, the label is regarded as a pioneer of the Riot Grrrl movement.
Kill Rock Stars (founded 1991)

Music festivals and events
 Yoyo A Go Go (1994–2001)
 Ladyfest (2000)
 The International Pop Underground Convention (1991)
 Girls to the Front (1991).

References

Olympia
 
Music scenes